See also: List of lunar eclipses, and List of 21st-century lunar eclipses

List of lunar eclipses between 2101 and 2200

References 
This list was compiled with data calculated by Fred Espenak of NASA's GSFC.

22
Lunar eclipses
Lunar eclipses

22nd century